The LB&SCR G class were powerful 2-2-2 locomotives, designed by William Stroudley of the London, Brighton and South Coast Railway in 1874.

History
A prototype single locomotive, No. 151 Grosvenor, was designed by Stroudley and produced by Brighton railway works in December 1874. This was extensively tested before a second, scaled down locomotive No. 325 Abergavenny, was ordered in June 1876 and completed in January 1877. Both locomotives performed adequately, but Abergavenny was significantly less powerful than Grosvenor. A modified design was developed and twelve further locomotives were built between December 1880 and November 1881.
The members of this class worked express trains between London and South Coast towns such as Portsmouth, Brighton and Eastbourne, and covered large mileages. The introduction of the Billinton B2 class made the singles redundant on the Portsmouth line and so several were transferred to Tunbridge Wells.

Withdrawals began in May 1905, and the last locomotive survived until May 1914. No examples have been preserved, but there is a model of No. 331 Fairlight in the museum at Sheffield Park on the Bluebell Railway.

Locomotive summary

Sources

External links
 Stroudley "G" Class Single 2-2-2 Southern E-Group
 LB&SC steam locomotives The Terminal

2-2-2 locomotives
G
Railway locomotives introduced in 1874
Scrapped locomotives
Standard gauge steam locomotives of Great Britain